Kalavida is a 1997 Kannada-language film produced, written, directed and enacted by V. Ravichandran. The rest of the cast includes Heera Rajagopal, Roja, Umashree, Raghuvaran amongst others.

The music was composed by Hamsalekha and was declared a musical hit upon release.

Cast
 Ravichandran 
 Roja 
 Heera Rajagopal 
 Raghuvaran 
 Dolly Minhas 
 Umashree
 Vaishali Kasaravalli
 Anjali Sudhakar
 Chi. Guru Dutt
 B. V. Radha
 Ramesh Bhat
 Lohithaswa
 Shivaram
 Umesh

Soundtrack

References

1990s Kannada-language films
1997 films
Films scored by Hamsalekha
1990s romantic thriller films
Films directed by V. Ravichandran
Indian romantic thriller films
Indian films about revenge